Aşağı Ağcayazı (also, Ashaga Agdzhayazy and Ashagy Agdzhayazy) is a village in the Agdash Rayon of Azerbaijan.  The village forms part of the municipality of Yuxarı Ağcayazı.

References 

Populated places in Agdash District